Michael R. Crouse (born November 22, 1990) is a Canadian professional baseball outfielder for the Milwaukee Milkmen of the American Association of Professional Baseball. He has also been a member of the Toronto Blue Jays organization, and has competed for the Canadian national baseball team.

Career

Amateur career
Crouse attended Centennial Secondary School in Coquitlam, British Columbia. Crouse played baseball and basketball in high school, eventually choosing to focus on baseball.

Toronto Blue Jays
Out of high school, Crouse was drafted by the Toronto Blue Jays in the 16th round (489th overall) of the 2008 MLB draft. Crouse chose to sign with the Blue Jays instead of attending college. He made his professional debut in 2008, appearing in seven games with the Gulf Coast Blue Jays of the Rookie-level Gulf Coast League. He returned to the Gulf Coast Blue Jays in 2009. He was promoted to the Lansing Lugnuts of the Class-A Midwest League in 2010. With the Lugnuts, Crouse established himself as the team's starting right fielder, finishing the season with a .261 batting average, 14 home runs and 55 runs batted in. He led the Lugnuts with 38 stolen bases. Crouse joined the Dunedin Blue Jays in the Class-A Advanced Florida State League in 2012. He remained with the Blue Jays organization through the 2014 season, playing for the Double-A New Hampshire Fisher Cats, and was released in the offseason.

Lancaster Barnstormers
Crouse signed with the Lancaster Barnstormers of the Atlantic League of Professional Baseball, an independent league, for the 2015 season. He missed the entire campaign due to injury. He re-signed with the team on January 26, 2016.

New Britain Bees
Lancaster traded Crouse to the New Britain Bees on May 21, 2016, and finished the 2016 Atlantic League season with a league leading 61 stolen bases.

Pericos de Puebla
Crouse signed with the Pericos de Puebla of the Mexican League for the 2018 season.

Algodoneros de Unión
He signed with Algodoneros de Unión Laguna in early 2019, but was released on May 21, 2019.

Somerset Patriots
On May 28, 2019, Crouse signed with the Somerset Patriots of the Atlantic League of Professional Baseball.

Chicago Dogs
On March 16, 2020, Crouse signed with the Chicago Dogs of the American Association of Independent Professional Baseball. Crouse played in 58 games for Chicago in 2020, slashing .262/.379/.457 with 10 home runs, 30 RBI, and 20 stolen bases. He improved upon his previous season in 2021, appearing in 73 games for the club in 2021, batting .277/.383/.492 with 13 home runs, 64 RBI, and 33 stolen bases. In 2022, Crouse made 87 appearances for Chicago, hitting .283/.400/.406 with 7 home runs, 47 RBI, and 38 stolen bases.

Winnipeg Goldeyes
On August 27, 2022, Crouse was traded to the Winnipeg Goldeyes of the American Association of Professional Baseball in exchange for Eric Rivera. Crouse appeared in 9 games for Winnipeg to round out the year, going 4-for-27 with  eight walks, no home runs, and 2 RBI.

Milwaukee Milkmen
On January 18, 2023, Crouse was claimed off waivers by the Milwaukee Milkmen.

International career
Crouse has played for the Canadian national baseball team. He played in the 2008 World Junior Baseball Championship, being named to the tournament's All-Star team. He also participated in the 2011 Baseball World Cup, winning the bronze medal, and the 2011 Pan American Games, winning the gold medal. He was the youngest player on the team.

Scouting profile
Drafted as a centre fielder, Crouse is expected to remain in right field.

Personal
Crouse's father, Ray Crouse, a football running back, played in the National Football League and Canadian Football League.

References

External links

1990 births
Living people
Algodoneros de Unión Laguna players
Black Canadian baseball players
Baseball people from British Columbia
Baseball players at the 2011 Pan American Games
Baseball players at the 2019 Pan American Games
Canadian people of African-American descent
Canadian expatriate baseball players in Mexico
Canadian expatriate baseball players in the United States
Canberra Cavalry players
Caribes de Anzoátegui players
Chicago Dogs players
Dunedin Blue Jays players
Gulf Coast Blue Jays players
Lansing Lugnuts players
Melbourne Aces players
Mexican League baseball outfielders
New Britain Bees players
New Hampshire Fisher Cats players
Pericos de Puebla players
Pan American Games gold medalists for Canada
Pan American Games silver medalists for Canada
Pan American Games medalists in baseball
People from Port Moody
Somerset Patriots players
Sydney Blue Sox players
World Baseball Classic players of Canada
2017 World Baseball Classic players
Medalists at the 2019 Pan American Games
Medalists at the 2011 Pan American Games
Canadian expatriate baseball players in Australia
Canadian expatriate baseball players in Venezuela